Calypogeia is a genus of liverworts in the family Calypogeiaceae. It contains the following species (but this list may be incomplete):
 Calypogeia arguta Mont. & Nees.
 Calypogeia azurea Stotler & Crotz
 Calypogeia fissa (L.) Raddi
 Calypogeia muelleriana (Schiffn.) Müll.-Frib.
 Calypogeia rhynchophylla (Herzog) Bischl.
 Calypogeia suecica (Arn. & Pers.) K.Mull.

References

Calypogeiaceae
Jungermanniales genera
Taxonomy articles created by Polbot